This article lists plants commonly found in the wild, which are edible to humans and thus forageable. Some are only edible in part, while the entirety of others are edible. Some plants (or select parts) require cooking to make them safe for consumption.

Field guides instruct foragers to carefully identify species before assuming that any wild plant is edible. Accurate determination ensures edibility and safeguards against potentially fatal poisoning. Some plants that are generally edible can cause allergic reactions in some individuals. U.S. Army guidelines advise to test for contact dermatitis, then chew and hold a pinch in the mouth for 15 minutes before swallowing. If any negative effect results, it is advised to induce vomiting and drink a high quantity of water. Additionally, old or improperly stored specimens can cause food poisoning.

Other lists of edible seeds, mushrooms, flowers, nuts, vegetable oils and leaves may partially overlap with this one. Separately, a list of poisonous plants catalogs toxic species.

List

These lists are ordered by the binomial (Latin) name of the species.

Trees and shrubs

Herbaceous plants

See also 

Rubus
Wild edible plants of Israel / Palestine

References

Sources

Further reading 

Vol. 1, Fruits: Actinidiaceae–Cycadaceae (2012): 
Vol. 2, Fruits: Clusiaceae–Fabaceae (2012): 
Vol. 3, Fruits: Ginkgoaceae–Myrtaceae (2012): 

Lists of plants
Edible plants

de:Wildgemüse